Siobhán Bernadette Haughey (born 31 October 1997; pronounced is a Hong Kong competitive swimmer. She became the first Hong Kong swimmer to win an Olympic medal and the first Hong Kong athlete to win two Olympic medals in any sport, after winning silver in the women's 200-metre freestyle and women's 100-metre freestyle during the Tokyo 2020 Summer Olympics. 

Haughey is also Hong Kong’s first World Record holding swimmer after breaking the 200-metre freestyle record at the  2021 World Short Course Championships, as well as the first ever Short Course World champion and Junior World's champion. She has broken 19 Hong Kong records and 6 Asian records in her career (currently holding 18 and 5 records) and breaking them for 77 times and 21 times respectively. She represents Energy Standard in the International Swimming League.

Personal life
Haughey was born in Hong Kong on 31 October 1997, shortly after the handover of Hong Kong, to an Irish father, Darach, and a Hongkonger mother, Canjo. She was baptised a Catholic at St. Margaret’s Church. Her elder sister, Aisling, is also a swimmer and represented Hong Kong in amateur events. Her paternal granduncle was former Irish Taoiseach Charles Haughey. Siobhan attended St. Paul's Primary Catholic School and St. Paul's Secondary School. She graduated from the University of Michigan in 2019, majoring in psychology.

Swimming career
Haughey won gold and broke the meet record in the 100-metre freestyle at the World Junior Championships in 2013; she was the first Hong Kong swimmer to medal at the event. She won two silver and five bronze medals in 2013 East Asian Games, making her the most decorated Hong Kong athlete all time in a single East Asian Games.

In 2014, she gained another two silver medals in the women's 100-metre freestyle and 200m individual medley at the Youth Olympics, again setting history for the Hong Kong swimming team. In 2016, she was named Swimmer of the Championships at the Big Ten Conference championships and helped lead the Michigan Wolverines swimming and diving team to the women's team title for the first time since 2004. 

Back in 2015 Haughey qualified for the Summer Olympics in Rio de Janeiro as the first Hong Kong swimmer to make the Olympic Qualifying Time (OQT), and was selected to represent Hong Kong in the women's 200-metre freestyle and 200-metre individual medley. At the Rio Olympics, Haughey won her heat in the 200-metre freestyle, but finished sixth in the semifinals and thirteenth overall. Despite failing to advance to the finals, she still made history as the first Hong Kong swimmer to advance beyond the heats in the modern Olympics era.

In 2017 Haughey participated in the World Aquatics Championships, and finished 5th in women's 200-metre freestyle. This marked the first time Hong Kong had a swimmer in a final at the long course World Championships meet. A few weeks later in the Taipei Universiade, she won gold in both the women's 100-metre freestyle and 200-metre freestyle. 

In 2019 Haughey stepped up again in the World Aquatics Championships and raced her fastest time ever in the 200-metre freestyle event, finishing with a time of 1:54.98 to fall just .2 shy of the podium and finishing fourth. As such, Haughey just became the first woman ever from Hong Kong to hit a sub-1:55 200m freestyle time. Later at the inaugural International Swimming League season, she continued her onslaught of the Hong Kong National Records in swimming, setting new Asian records in both the 200-metre freestyle and 50-metre breaststroke.

Haughey represented Hong Kong again at the Tokyo 2020 Summer Olympics, where she won silver in the 200-metre freestyle and 100-metre freestyle. She became the first Hong Kong swimmer to win an Olympic medal and the first Hong Kong athlete to win two Olympic medals in any sport. In the 2021 International Swimming League season, she went undefeated in the 200-metre freestyle event throughout the season and set a new Asian record in the 100-metre freestyle. Additionally, she finished second in the ISL season MVP standings, 43.5 points behind Energy Standard teammate Sarah Sjöström and 64.5 points ahead of third place. 

Later in the year, she followed up her performance at the Tokyo Olympics and the ISL with a historic gold medal in the 200-metre freestyle at the 2021 Short Course World Championships. In the process, she broke Sarah Sjöström's 2017 world record by 0.12 seconds and became the first Hong Kong swimmer to win a medal at the Short Course Worlds Championships, plus the first world record holder. She won a second gold medal two days later in the 100-metre freestyle event, plus a bronze medal in 400-metre freestyle.

Honours
Hong Kong Sports Stars Awards  
 Best of the Best Hong Kong Sports Stars Award for Women (2021)
 Three-time winner of the Hong Kong Sports Stars Award (2017, 2019, 2021)
 Two-time winner of the Hong Kong Junior Sports Stars Awards (2013, 2014)
 Three-time SwimSwam Asian Female Swimmer of the Year (2019, 2020, 2021)
 HKSAR Silver Bauhinia Star (2021)
 HKSAR Chief Executive's Commendation for Community Service (2017)
 Big Ten Medal of Honor (2019)
 14-time CSCAA All-American (2016-19: 200-yard Freestyle; 2017-19: 800-yard Freestyle Relay; 2018-19: 100-yard Freestyle, 200-yard Freestyle Relay, 400-yard Freestyle Relay; 2019: 400-yard Medley Relay)
 11-time CSCAA All-America Honorable Mention (2016-18: 200-yard IM; 2017-18: 400-yard Medley Relay; 2016-17: 100-yard Freestyle, 400-yard Freestyle Relay; 2016: 200-yard Freestyle Relay, 800-yard Freestyle Relay)
 15-time Big Ten champion (2016-19: 200-yard Freestyle; 2016, 2018-19: 400-yard Freestyle Relay; 2016-17, 2019: 800-yard Freestyle Relay; 2016, 2019: 100-yard Freestyle; 2016, 2018: 200-yard IM; 2019: 200-yard Freestyle Relay)
 2016 Big Ten Swimmer of the Championships
 Four-time All-Big Ten (2016-19: First Team)
 Two-time CSCAA Scholar All-American (2017-18)
 Three-time Academic All-Big Ten (2017-19)
 Big Ten Distinguished Scholar (2018)
 Four-time U-M Athletic Academic Achievement (2016-19)

World records

Short Course (25m)

References

External links
 
 
 

1997 births
Living people
Hong Kong female freestyle swimmers
Hong Kong female medley swimmers
Olympic swimmers of Hong Kong
Swimmers at the 2016 Summer Olympics
Swimmers at the 2020 Summer Olympics
Swimmers at the 2014 Summer Youth Olympics
Asian Games medalists in swimming
Medalists at the 2014 Asian Games
Hong Kong people of Irish descent
Asian Games bronze medalists for Hong Kong
Swimmers at the 2014 Asian Games
Universiade medalists in swimming
Michigan Wolverines women's swimmers
Universiade medalists for Hong Kong
Medalists at the 2017 Summer Universiade
Olympic silver medalists for Hong Kong
Olympic silver medalists in swimming
Medalists at the 2020 Summer Olympics
Haughey family
Hong Kong Roman Catholics
University of Michigan alumni
Medalists at the FINA World Swimming Championships (25 m)
World record holders in swimming